This is a partial chronological list of cases decided by the United States Supreme Court during the tenure of Chief Justice Morrison Waite from March 4, 1874, through March 23, 1888.

References

External links 

Waite
List